Sheila Terry (born Kay Clark, March 5, 1910 – January 19, 1957) was an American film actress.

Early years 
Although she wanted to be an actress, Terry studied to be a teacher in accordance with the desires of a rich uncle. After being trained as an educator, from 1927 to 1929 she taught in a country school to meet the requirement for receiving her inheritance from that uncle. The inheritance was in stocks, however, and its value vanished in the 1929 crash of the stock market.

Career
Terry first studied dramatics at Dickson-Kenwin academy, a Toronto school affiliated with London's Royal Academy. For approximately seven months, she acted in stock theater in Toronto. Later she moved to New York, where she continued her studies and appeared in a number of plays. A film scout saw her on Broadway in The Little Racketeer and offered her a test that resulted in a contract with Warner Bros.

In the 1930s, she appeared with John Wayne in the Western films Haunted Gold (1932), 'Neath the Arizona Skies (1934) and The Lawless Frontier (1934). She appeared with Bette Davis, Louis Calhern and Spencer Tracy in 20,000 Years in Sing Sing (1932), and with Cary Grant and Sylvia Sidney in Marion Gering's film Madame Butterfly (1932). In 1933, she left Hollywood briefly for the New York stage.

Personal life
She married Major Laurence B. Clark, a wealthy Toronto socialite, on August 16, 1928. They separated on August 15, 1930, and she divorced him on February 15, 1934. In 1937, she married William Magee of San Francisco, and retired from show business. After his death, Terry wanted to return to show business, but couldn't find a job.

In 1947, Terry said in a newspaper interview, "I'm going back into show business and I need an act, I can't sing, I can't dance and I can't play the piano. I should be terrific in night clubs". She worked as a press agent for 15 years.

Death
In January 1957, her body was discovered in her third floor apartment, which was both her home and office. A friend and neighbor, Jerry Keating, went to her apartment after he failed to reach her on the telephone. The door was locked, and Terry did not answer the bell. Keating called the police, who broke in and found Terry's body on the bedroom floor, her back leaning against the bed, with five empty capsules on the floor beside her. Friends told the police that she had returned from a trip to Mexico some time before her death and that she was ill when she came home. It was later discovered that she died broke, leaving only a scant wardrobe.

She was buried in Potter's Field in New York City.

Partial filmography

Week-End Marriage (1932) - Connie
Jewel Robbery (1932) - Blonde Decoy (uncredited)
Crooner (1932) - Hat Check Girl (uncredited)
Two Against the World (1932) - Miss Edwards - Norton's Secretary (uncredited)
Big City Blues (1932) - Lorna St. Clair (uncredited)
A Scarlet Week-End (1932) - Marjorie Murphy
They Call It Sin (1932) - Telephone Operator (uncredited)
Three on a Match (1932) - Naomi (uncredited)
Scarlet Dawn (1932) - Marjorie
I Am a Fugitive from a Chain Gang (1932) - Allen's Secretary (uncredited)
You Said a Mouthful (1932) - Cora Norton
Lawyer Man (1932) - Flo - Gilmurry's Moll (uncredited)
Haunted Gold (1932) - Janet Carter
Madame Butterfly (1932) - Mrs. Pinkerton
20,000 Years in Sing Sing (1932) - "Babe" Saunders - Bud's Wife (uncredited)
The Match King (1932) - Blonde Telephone Operator (uncredited)
Parachute Jumper (1933) - Weber's Secretary (uncredited)
The Sphinx (1933) - Jerry Crane
The Silk Express (1933) - Paula Nyberg
Private Detective 62 (1933) - Mrs. Wright (uncredited)
The Mayor of Hell (1933) - Blonde with Mike
Son of a Sailor (1933) - Genevieve
The House on 56th Street (1933) - Dolly
Convention City (1933) - Mrs. Kent
Take the Stand (1934) - Mrs. Pearl Reynolds
Rocky Rhodes (1934) - Nan Street
When Strangers Meet (1934) - Dolly
The Lawless Frontier (1934) - Ruby
'Neath the Arizona Skies (1934) - Clara Moore
Rescue Squad (1935) - Rose
Social Error (1935) - Sonia
Society Fever (1935) - Lucy Prouty
Bars of Hate (1935) - Ann Dawson
A Scream in the Night (1935) - Edith Bentley
Murder on a Bridle Path (1936) - Violet Feverel
Special Investigator (1936) - Judy Taylor
Go-Get-'Em, Haines (1936) - Jane Kent
Fury Below (1936) - Claire Johnson
A Girl's Best Years (1936, Short) - Phyllis Rodgers
Hit the Saddle (1937) - Rita's Cantina Friend (uncredited)
Sky Racket (1937) - Wedding Guest (uncredited)
I Demand Payment (1938) - Rita Avery

Sources
 "Sheila Terry divorces hubby". Border Cities Star. February 16, 1934. 
 "Sheila Terry turns unwanted role into personal triumph". The Milwaukee Sentinel. April 11, 1936.
 "Tower Ticket". Chicago Daily Tribune. December 27, 1948.
 "Sheila Terry, Starlet and playgirl of the 1920s, dies". Los Angeles Times. January 20, 1957.

References

External links

 

1910 births
1957 suicides
People from Warroad, Minnesota
American film actresses
20th-century American actresses
American stage actresses
Drug-related suicides in New York City
Suicides in New York City
Drug-related deaths in New York City